President Elect: 1988 Edition is a 1987 video game published by Strategic Simulations.

Gameplay
President Elect: 1988 Edition is a game in which the 1988 Republican primaries and Democratic primaries, and the 1988 United States presidential election are simulated. The player can choose from any presidential election from 1960 to 1988 inclusive. The election can be either historical or ahistorical (the latter effectively a custom scenario). 

President Elect: 1988 Edition was released in 1987 for the Apple II and Commodore 64, as well as for the Atari ST and MS-DOS computers. The 1988 Edition did not change gameplay at all, but simply added the historical Reagan vs. Mondale 1984 election, with a new 1988 scenario with no historical candidates. The game also added new playable candidates, such as Bill Clinton, Bruce Babbitt, Michael Dukakis, Richard Gephardt, Geraldine Ferraro, Jack Kemp, and Oliver North.

Reception
Wyatt Lee reviewed the game for Computer Gaming World, and stated that "President Elect 1988 Edition is a stimulating, educational, and challenging experience of American presidential politics. If you follow political events with any interest at all, you owe it to yourself to play this game, at least, once."

President Elect author Nelson Hernandez—calling himself "the best predictor of presidential elections in the country"—claimed that, with the 1988 edition of the game, in July 1988 he predicted the electoral and popular votes of the election that year within 1% each of the actual results.

Orson Scott Card favorably reviewed the 1988 edition of President Elect for Compute!. While he criticized aspects of the game's design, he noted that the game accurately simulated how "the strongest forces", like the economy, "are completely out of the players' control ... that's the way it works in the real world".

References

External links
Review in Antic
Review in Ahoy!

1987 video games
Apple II games
Atari ST games
Commodore 64 games
DOS games
Political video games
Simulation video games
Strategic Simulations games
Video games developed in the United States
Video games set in 1988
Video games set in the United States